Ee Preethi Yeke Bhoomi Melide is a 2007 Indian Kannada-language romance film directed, written and enacted by Prem. The film also features Rohini, Namratha and Sharan in other pivotal roles. Bollywood actress Mallika Sherawat appeared in a special dance number whilst actors Ambareesh, Sudharani and Vinaya Prasad appeared in brief cameo roles. The film had musical soundtrack scored by R. P. Patnaik whilst the background score was V. Harikrishna.

The film opened on 28 December 2007 to mixed reviews and performed badly at the box-office.

Cast
 Prem 
 Rohini
 Namratha
 Sharan
 Ramesh Bhat
 Raghu Ram
 Layendra
 Sihi Kahi Chandru
 Master Kishan
 Tejaswini Prakash
 Mallika Sherawat in an item song
 Ambareesh in guest appearance
 Sudharani in guest appearance
 Vinaya Prasad in guest appearance
 B. Jayashree in guest appearance

Soundtrack
The film's score and soundtrack was composed by R. P. Patnaik.

Reception

Critical response 
A critic from Rediff.com wrote that "The film starts off slowly and drags right until the end". A critic from Deccan Herald wrote that "The director has spent considerable energy, thinking out and using every trick in the trade; a small portion of spending the same energy on a coherent script would have been the icing on a cake".

References

Indian romance films
2007 films
2000s Kannada-language films
2000s romance films
Films directed by Prem